BK is the working name of the English hard house producer Ben Keen (born 16th October 1975, Woodford, London).

His "Revolution" single became one of the few hard house records to receive regular airplay on daytime BBC Radio 1, and between 1995 and 2005, he produced over one hundred 12" singles. He was the last artist to reach the UK Singles Chart with a vinyl only release ("Revolution"). He secured six hits in the UK chart.

BK started his career in production at the age of 16, when employed as a trainee engineer.  He moved later to writing music for both film and television, having gained recording studio experience at Media Records. He progressed to recording his own music for Nukleuz Records, and performing worldwide as a club DJ.

A regular in the DJ Mag top 100 he was also credited with being a pioneer of the scene and its most successful producer. While the in-house producer at Nukleuz records they won the largest selling independent label award two years running.

In 2021 he launched an educational masterclass to teach aspiring producers how he created his 2003 hit Revolution.

Discography

Singles

† Fergie and BK
‡ BK and Nick Sentience
¶ Cortina featuring BK and Madam Friction

References

External links
Interview with BK

1973 births
Living people
English record producers
English house musicians
English DJs
People from Woodford, London
Electronic dance music DJs